An Open Book (2004) is a collection of poems by Orson Scott Card.

Contents
I - Hunger, Love, and Death 
Walking on Water 
Short-Lived Creatures 
Echo 
Grain of the Wood 
Of a Private History 
This Is the Poem I Made Then 
I Go Out the Door 
The Man Who Came Back from the Lunar Colony 
5 a.m. 
Declaration 
Myrtle Beach 
Elves 
Light and Shade 
Rapunzel Summons the Prince 
In Touch 
My Son in Love 
Barbarians 
Browning, Cummings, Tennyson 
To One Not Poisoned Yet 
To Alice, Recently of Wonderland 
How Do You Know You Love Me? 
Lovers Do 
In Winter I Wrote Love Poems 
Hands 
Old House 
Old Mother 
Grandfather Is Home from Seattle 
He Died of Cystic Fibrosis at 24 
Prayer in the ICU 
Grandma in the Corner, Dying 
O Hurried Guest 
A Poem for Erin's First Christmas 
Worlds Might Stumble 
When 
Of My Beloved Son

II - Apocalyptic Verses 
Tin Men 
On Another Road 
If I Hadn't Overturned the Stone 
Dog and Bear 
Winter of Wishes 
Judge 
One Will Be Taken 
Broken Kings 
Hordes 
Outside the Ark 
Potion for Immortality 
From a Spirit to the One Possessed 
Warning to a Long-Haired Woman 
Redeemers 
Fire at the End of the World 
Point Most West 
No Snow White 
Mammon 
Needle

III - Wholly Writ 
Corn Is the Soil Song 
Last Supper 
Slight Bread 
If Jesus Wept 
Holy Moments 
John 4:14, 15 
Unremarkable They Grow 
Is Prophecy a Gift? 
Jacob Smith of Somerset 
Openings 
Thou Whose Hand Is Ever Light 
Deep Slow Illness 
All That the Earth Can Yield

See also
List of works by Orson Scott Card
Orson Scott Card

External links
 About the book An Open Book from Card's website

2004 poetry books
American poetry collections
Poetry by Orson Scott Card